Kanab Creek is one of the many tributaries of the Colorado River.

The stream flows southwest and passes just to the east of the community of Alton where it turns to the south and passes under Utah State Route 136. It continues to the south and runs parallel to U.S. Route 89 past Kanab. The stream enters Arizona where it becomes the border between Coconino and Mohave counties and flows past Fredonia.

The valley of Kanab Creek was settled by Basketmaker and Anasazi Indians. Ruins of their buildings and artifacts are found along its course.

See also 
 Kanab Creek Trail
 List of tributaries of the Colorado River

References

External links 

 Columbia Gazetteer: Kanab Creek

Rivers of Utah
Rivers of Arizona
Tributaries of the Colorado River in Utah
Tributaries of the Colorado River in Arizona
Rivers of Coconino County, Arizona
Rivers of Kane County, Utah
Grand Canyon, North Rim
Grand Canyon, North Rim (west)